Castinus I (? – 237) was reputedly the Bishop of Byzantium between 230 and 237. In some catalogues, he appears as Constantine.

He was a senator from Rome, who initially was not a Christian. He converted to Christianity, being baptised by the bishop of Argyropolis, Cyrillianus. From then on, he gave his fortune to the poor and was devoted to the Church. He was bishop of Byzantium from 230 to 237. Until his tenure, the cathedral was near the sea in the area of present Galata. He built one of the oldest churches in Byzantium to honour Saint Euphemia.

Nicephorus Callistus refers to him in his works as Constantine.

His memory is revered on January 25.

Church historian Frederick George Holweck says that there were no bishops at Byzantium in the third century.

References

Sources
The Ecumenical Patriarchate of Constantinople

3rd-century Romans
3rd-century Byzantine bishops
Bishops of Byzantium
3rd-century Christian saints